You So Crazy is a 1994 stand up comedy film directed by Thomas Schlamme and starring Martin Lawrence. It was his first major film and stand-up act. Lawrence wears a black, leather suit in the film similar to the wardrobe worn by Eddie Murphy in his films Delirious and Raw.

During the routine, Lawrence comments on various topics such as his success, growing up, sexual acts and racism. The concert was filmed at the Majestic Theatre in 1993 in New York City before a sold-out crowd.  Martin followed You So Crazy up with Martin Lawrence Live: Runteldat in 2002.

You So Crazy helped Lawrence breakout during the early 1990s.  The film went on to become a success for Lawrence, generating over $10 million at the box office. The film was also gained popularity thanks to late night airings on HBO and Cinemax.

The film originally received an NC-17 rating from the MPAA, causing Miramax (the film's original distributor) to sell it to Samuel Goldwyn, which released it unrated.

Reception
On Rotten Tomatoes it has an approval rating of 50% based on reviews from 10 critics.

References

External links
 

1994 films
Stand-up comedy concert films
1994 comedy films
1990s English-language films
American comedy films
The Samuel Goldwyn Company films
African-American films
Films directed by Thomas Schlamme
1990s American films